Chrysina beyeri, or Beyer's scarab, is a species of shining leaf chafer in the family of beetles known as Scarabaeidae.

References

Further reading

External links

 

Rutelinae
Articles created by Qbugbot
Beetles described in 1905